The , literally meaning "Inner Minister", was an ancient office in the Japanese Imperial Court. Its role, rank and authority varied throughout the pre-Meiji period of Japanese history, but in general remained as a significant post under the Taihō Code.

History

Pre-Meiji period
The office of Naidaijin predated the Taihō Code of 701. Fujiwara no Kamatari was the first person appointed to the post in 669. After the appointment of Fujiwara no Michitaka in 989, the office became permanently established, ranking just below that of Udaijin ("Right Minister") and Sadaijin ("Left Minister").

Meiji period and after

The office developed a different character in the Meiji period. In 1885, the title was reconfigured to mean the Lord Keeper of the Privy Seal of Japan in the Imperial Court.  In that year, the office of prime minister or chief minister of the initial restoration government was the Daijō-daijin, Sanjō Sanetomi.  In December, Sanjō petitioned the emperor to be relieved of his office; and he was then immediately appointed Naidaijin, or Lord Keeper of the Privy Seal.

The office of the Privy Seal was identical with the old Naidaijin only in the sense of the Japanese title—not in terms of function or powers.

The nature of the office further evolved in the Taishō and Shōwa periods. The title was abolished on November 24, 1945.

See also
 Daijō-kan
 Kugyō
 Sesshō and Kampaku
 List of Daijō-daijin
 Kōkyū
 Kuge
 Imperial Household Agency

Notes

References

  Asai, T. (1985). Nyokan Tūkai. Tokyo: Kōdansha.
 Dickenson, Walter G. (1869). Japan: Being a Sketch of the History, Government and Officers of the Empire. London: W. Blackwood and Sons. 
 Ozaki, Yukio. (2001). The Autobiography of Ozaki Yukio: The Struggle for Constitutional Government in Japan. [Translated by Fujiko Hara]. Princeton: Princeton University Press.  (cloth)
  Ozaki, Yukio. (1955). Ozak Gakudō Zenshū. Tokyo: Kōronsha.
 Sansom, George (1958). A History of Japan to 1334. Stanford: Stanford University Press. 
 Dus, Peter. (1988). The Cambridge History of Japan: the Twentieth Century, Vol. 6. Cambridge: Cambridge University Press. 
 Ozaki, Yukio. (2001). The Autobiography of Ozaki Yukio: The Struggle for Constitutional Government in Japan. [Translated by Fujiko Hara]. Princeton: Princeton University Press.  (cloth)
 Screech, Timon. (2006). Secret Memoirs of the Shoguns:  Isaac Titsingh and Japan, 1779-1822. London: Routledge Curzon.  
  Titsingh, Isaac. (1834). [Siyun-sai Rin-siyo/Hayashi Gahō, 1652], Nipon o daï itsi ran; ou, Annales des empereurs du Japon.  Paris: Oriental Translation Fund of Great Britain and Ireland.
 Varley, H. Paul, ed. (1980). [ Kitabatake Chikafusa, 1359], Jinnō Shōtōki ("A Chronicle of Gods and Sovereigns: Jinnō Shōtōki of Kitabatake Chikafusa" translated by H. Paul Varley). New York: Columbia University Press.  

Government of feudal Japan